Miss Universe Spain 2017 was the fifth edition of the Miss Universe Spain pageant. It was held in Teatro Fortuna, Hotel THB Torrequebrada Class in Málaga on September 24 with 40 finalists competing. Noelia Freire of Ciudad Real will crown her successor Sofía del Prado of Castilla-La Mancha at the end of the event. The winner will represent Spain at Miss Universe 2017 pageant.

Results

Placements
40 contestants competed for the title of Miss Universe Spain 2017:

Special Awards

Candidates
The official Top 40 Candidates of Miss Universe Spain 2017.

References

External links

Universe Spain
Miss Spain
September 2017 events in Spain
2017 in Andalusia